Le Chabichou is a 4-star hotel and a 2 Michelin-starred restaurant in Courchevel, Savoie, France. The hotel was opened in 1962 by Michel Rochedy. The restaurant received its first Michelin star in 1979 and its second in 1984.

References

Bibliography 
 1998 : Les sommets de Michel Rochedy - par Alain Berenguer - Henri Michel Editions
 2007 : Le Chabichou ou La montagne apprivoisée - par Michel Rochedy - Glénat

External links
Official site

Hotels in France
Hotels established in 1962
Buildings and structures in Savoie
Michelin Guide starred restaurants in France